MST may refer to:

Science and technology
 Madison Symmetric Torus, a plasma experiment at the University of Wisconsin–Madison, US
 Magnetic secure transmission, whereby a smartphone mimics a payment card's magnetic stripe
 Magnetic seizure therapy, a form of electrotherapy and electrical brain stimulation
 Medial superior temporal area, of the primate brain
 Microscale thermophoresis, moving particles in a microthermal gradient
 Micro systems technology, of micromachines
 Measurement Science and Technology, an academic journal
 Mobile service tower, a movable tower to provide services for a rocket launch

Computing
 Minimum spanning tree, in graph theory
 .mst, a file extension of Microsoft Windows Installer
 Multiple Spanning Tree Protocol, for computer networks
 Multi-Stream Transport, multiple displays on a single DisplayPort connector

Education
 Manchester School of Technology, in Manchester, New Hampshire, US
 Master of Studies, a postgraduate degree
 Master of Science in Teaching, a postgraduate degree
 Melbourne School of Theology
Missouri University of Science and Technology, in Rolla, Missouri, US
 SKH Bishop Mok Sau Tseng Secondary School, Hong Kong

Military
 Marine Science Technician, US Coast Guard rating
 Military sexual trauma
 Mobile Ship Target, term used in US Navy

Organisations
 Media Standards Trust, UK
 Missionary Society of Saint Thomas, the Apostle
 Monterey–Salinas Transit, a bus company in Monterey County, California, United States

Politics
 Landless Workers' Movement,, Brazil
 Workers' Socialist Movement (Argentina)
 Workers' Socialist Movement (Puerto Rico)

Time zones
 Malaysia Standard Time (UTC+8)
 Mountain Standard Time (UTC−7), in North America
 Myanmar Standard Time (more commonly MMT) (UTC+6:30)

Other uses
 Mountains-to-Sea Trail, a hiking trail across North Carolina, US
 Maastricht Aachen Airport (IATA code), the Netherlands
 Manila Standard Today, a newspaper
 Multisystemic therapy, a treatment program for violent youth
 Mystery Science Theater 3000 (abbreviated as MST3K), an American television comedy series.

See also
 Macrophage-stimulating 1 (MST1), gene encoding the macrophage-stimulating protein